The 1945 College Football All-America team is composed of college football players who were selected as All-Americans by various organizations and writers that chose College Football All-America Teams in 1945. The nine selectors recognized by the NCAA as "official" for the 1945 season are (1) Collier's Weekly, as selected by Grantland Rice, (2) the Associated Press, (3) the United Press, (4) the All-America Board, (5) the American Football Coaches Association (AFCA), (6) the Football Writers Association of America (FWAA), (7) the International News Service (INS), (8) Look magazine, (9) the Newspaper Enterprise Association (NEA) and (10) the Sporting News.

Consensus All-Americans
For the year 1945, the NCAA recognizes 10 published All-American teams as "official" designations for purposes of its consensus determinations. The following chart identifies the NCAA-recognized consensus All-Americans and displays which first-team designations they received.

All-American selections for 1945

Ends
 Dick Duden, Navy (College Football Hall of Fame) (AAB; AFCA; AP-1; COL-1; FWAA-1; INS-2; SN; UP-1; YA; CNS-1; CP-1; NL; NYS; OF-1; WC-1)
 Hub Bechtol, Texas (College Football Hall of Fame) (AP-1; COL-1; FWAA-2; LK; CNS-1; CP-2)
 Bob Ravensberg, Indiana (UP-2; FWAA-1; SN; CP-1; INS-2; LK; CNS-2)
 Max Morris, Northwestern (AAB; AFCA; AP-2; FWAA-2; INS-1; UP-2; YA; CP-2; WC-1)
 Hank Foldberg, Army (AP-2; INS-1; NEA-1; UP-1; CNS-2; CP-3; NYS; OF-1)
 Henry Walker, Virginia (AP-3)
 Neill Armstrong, Oklahoma A&M (AP-3)
 Paul Walker, Yale (CP-3; NL)
 Richard Pitzer, Army (NEA-1)

Tackles
 Tex Coulter, Army (AAB; AFCA; AP-1; COL-1; FWAA-1; INS-1; NEA-1; SN; UP-1; CNS-1; CP-1; NL; NYS; OF-1; WC-1)
 George Savitsky, Penn (College Football Hall of Fame) (AAB; AFCA; AP-3; COL-1; FWAA-1; INS-2; LK; SN; UP-1; CNS-1; CP-1; WC-1)
 Albert Nemetz, Army (AP-1; FWAA-2; INS-2; NEA-1; UP-2; YA; NYS; CNS-2)
 Tom Hughes, Purdue (LK; FWAA-2; UP-2; CP-2; OF-1; CNS-2; NL)
 Thomas Dean, Southern Methodist Univ. (AP-2; YA)
 Mike Castronis, Georgia (INS-1)
 Jim Kekeris, Missouri (AP-2; CP-2)
 Clarence Esser, Wisconsin (AP-3)
 Buster McClure, Nevada (CP-3)
 Monte Moncrief, Texas A&M (CP-3)

Guards
 Warren Amling, Ohio State (College Football Hall of Fame) (AAB; AFCA; AP-1; COL-1; FWAA-1; INS-1; LK; SN; UP-1; CNS-1; CP-1; NL; NYS; OF-1; WC-1)
 John Green, Army (College Football Hall of Fame) (AAB; AFCA; AP-1; COL-1; FWAA-1; SN; UP-1; CNS-1; NYS; OF-1; WC-1)
 Al Sparlis, UCLA (College Football Hall of Fame) (AP-3; INS-2; LK; CNS-2; CP-1)
 John Mastrangelo, Notre Dame (AP-2; FWAA-2; INS-1; UP-2; YA; CNS-2; CP-2)
 James Carrington, Navy (FWAA-2; INS-2; UP-2)
 Joseph Dickinson, Penn (AP-2; CP-2)
 Jim Lecture, Northwestern (AP-3; CP-3)
 John Green, Army (CP-3; NEA-1; YA)
 Arthur Gerometta, Army (NEA-1)
 Hills, Georgia Tech (NL)

Centers
 Vaughn Mancha, Alabama (College Football Hall of Fame) (AP-1; COL-1; FWAA-1; INS-1; SN; UP-1; YA; CNS-1; CP-1; NYS; OF-1)
 Dick Scott, Navy (College Football Hall of Fame) (AAB; AFCA; AP-2; FWAA-2; INS-2; LK; UP-2; CNS-2; CP-2; NL; WC-1)
 Ralph Jenkins, Clemson (AP-3)
 Harold Watts, Michigan (CP-3)
 Herschel Fuson, Army (NEA-1)

Quarterbacks
 Harry Gilmer, Alabama (College Football Hall of Fame) (AP-2; COL-1; INS-2; LK; UP-2; FWAA-2; SN; UP-2; CNS-1; CP-2; NL; NYS; OF-1 [qb])
 Frank Dancewicz, Notre Dame (AP-2; FWAA-2; UP-2; CNS-2; CP-1)
 Arnold Tucker, Army (College Football Hall of Fame) (CP-3; INS-2; NEA-1)
 Gene Rossides, Columbia (CP-3)

Halfbacks
 Glenn Davis, Army (College Football Hall of Fame) (AAB; AFCA; AP-1; COL-1; FWAA-1; INS-1; LK; NEA-1; SN; UP-1; YA; CNS-1; CP-1; NL; NYS; OF-1; WC-1)
 Herman Wedemeyer, St. Mary's (Calif.) (College Football Hall of Fame) (AAB; AFCA; AP-1; COL-1; FWAA-1; INS-1; LK; SN; UP-1; CNS-1; CP-1; NL; OF-1; WC-1)
 Bob Fenimore, Oklahoma State (College Football Hall of Fame) (AAB; AFCA; AP-1; FWAA-1; INS-1; SN; UP-1; CP-2; CNS-2; WC-1)
 Jake Leicht, Oregon (YA; NYS)
 George Taliaferro, Indiana (AP-3; INS-2; CP-3; CNS-2)
 Clyde Scott, Navy (College Football Hall of Fame) (AP-3; UP-2)
 Stan Kozlowski, Holy Cross (AP-3; CP-2)
 Robert Evans, Penn (AP-3)
 Thomas McWilliam, Army (NEA-1)

Fullbacks
 Doc Blanchard, Army (College Football Hall of Fame) (AAB; AFCA; AP-1; COL-1; FWAA-1; INS-1; LK; NEA-1; SN; UP-1; YA; CNS-1; CP-1; NL; NYS; OF-1; WC-1)
 Pete Pihos, Indiana (College and Pro Football Hall of Fame) (AP-2; FWAA-2; UP-2; CNS-2; CP-2; YA)
 Ollie Cline, Ohio State (AP-2; FWAA-2)
 Walt Schlinkman, Texas Tech (INS-2)
 Ed Cody, Purdue (CP-3)

Black college All-Americans
During the 1940s, African-Americans were excluded from many college football programs and played the game at historically black colleges and universities (HBCUs). The major All-America selectors in these years did not include players from HBCUs. However, The Pittsburgh Courier each year selected its own All-America team from players at the HBCUS. The players chosen for 1946 were:
 Clarence Harkings, Langston, end
 Talmadge Owen, Clark, end
 James Moore, Wilberforce, tackle
 Wilfred Rawl, West Virginia State, tackle
 Richard Bolton, Clark, guard
 Willie Moses, Wiley, guard
 Isaiah Wilson, West Virginia State, center
 Leroy Cromartie, Florida A&M, back
 Bill Bass, Tennessee A&I, back
 Shelly Ross, Wiley, back
 Bernard Ingraham, Florida A&M, back

Key
 Bold – Consensus All-American
 -1 – First-team selection
 -2 – Second-team selection
 -3 – Third-team selection

Official selectors
 AAB = All-America Board
 AFCA = American Football Coaches Association
 AP = Associated Press
 COL = Collier's Weekly as selected by Grantland Rice
 FWAA = Football Writers Association of America
 INS = International News Service, "selected on the basis of ballots and information gathered from International News Service sports writers and football authorities all over the nation"
 LK = Look magazine
 NEA = Newspaper Enterprise Association. In a departure from normal practice, the NEA named the starters from the Army football team, which had won 17 straight games, as its All-American team for 1945I
 SN = Sporting News, selected by a poll of 163 sports writers and sportscasters
 UP = United Press

Other selectors
 CNS = Consensus All-American team picked based on assigning points to players selected as All-Americans by Oscar Fraley, Christy Walsh, United Press, Look, New York Sun, New York News, International News, Associated Press, Sporting News, and Collier's-Rice
 CP = Central Press Association, selected for the 15th straight year with the aid of the captains of the leading college teams
 NL = Navy Log
 NYS = New York Sun
 OF = Oscar Fraley, United Press sports writer
 WC = Walter Camp Football Foundation
 YA = Yank, the Army Weekly, based on a poll of 25 of the country's most widely known college football coaches

See also
 1945 All-Big Six Conference football team
 1945 All-Big Ten Conference football team
 1945 All-Pacific Coast Conference football team
 1945 All-SEC football team
 1945 All-Southwest Conference football team

References

All-America Team
College Football All-America Teams